Lauren Elder is an American artist and designer.  Throughout the mid-1980s to early 1990s she worked with the interdisciplinary performance ensemble, Contraband, as a set designer and performer.  Currently, she lives and works in California, teaches at California College of the Arts, and works with environmental art, as well as continuing in set design. Elder is known for being the sole survivor in the crash of a light airplane in the Sierra Nevada in the 1970s.

1976 plane crash
On April 26, 1976, Lauren decided to take up an offer to be the third passenger in a Cessna 182P, tail number N52855, on a trip from Oakland International Airport in Oakland, California to Furnace Creek Airport in Death Valley's Furnace Creek. The 36-year-old pilot had 213 flight hours (46 on type) experience and was not instrument rated. He probably flew east, up Bubbs Creek and sought but missed Kearsarge Pass through the Sierra. Lauren Elder, sitting in the back seat and enjoying the view of mountains all round, turned forward to see a wall of granite moving towards them. When she woke up, she realized that they had crashed.

The pilot and one other passenger, sitting in the front of the airplane, survived the crash but died by the following morning. The evening of the accident, Elder could see the lights of the Owens Valley below, but miles of wilderness, elevation and sheer, icy cliffs separated her from it. She was wearing nothing but a blouse, a wraparound skirt, and boots with two-inch heels. One of her arms was fractured. The morning following the accident, with both her companions dead and with no real possibility of rescue, Elder decided to climb down from the mountain to the valley below. At one point it was necessary to lower herself down a 100-foot-tall dry waterfall. She suffered from hallucinations on the way because of lack of sleep and shock. Her descent took 36 hours.

Finally, as Elder reached civilization, she had trouble finding help when she walked late that night into the town of Independence, California. People saw her disheveled appearance and were afraid; Charles Manson and his female followers had lived at the Barker Ranch in Inyo County, California seven years earlier and were arrested there in 1969 after the Tate—LaBianca murders, and members of the Manson Family had appeared at the preliminary hearing that took place in Independence before trial was transferred to Los Angeles.  

Lauren Elder wrote a book about the crash (with Shirley Streshinsky) entitled And I Alone Survived, which was later made into a TV movie with the same title, as well as a documentary aired by the Discovery Channel.

The National Transportation Safety Board (NTSB) ruled the accident was caused by the pilot in command (PIC), who "continued flight into known areas of severe turbulence." The NTSB also judged the PIC made "improper in-flight decisions or planning." The National Park Service continues to remove pieces of wreckage from Elder's flight. There have been nearly a dozen private and military airplane crashes in the immediate vicinity.

References

External links
 Lauren Elder's website
 And I Alone Survived at the Internet Movie Database
 NTSB report for the crash

Year of birth missing (living people)
Living people
Survivors of aviation accidents or incidents
Sole survivors
Environmental artists
American scenic designers
Women scenic designers